

Families

Abbreviations explanation

See also

 List of szlachta
 List of Polish titled nobility
 Magnates of Poland and Lithuania

Bibliography
 Karl Friedrich von Frank, Standeserhebungen und Gnadenakte für das Deutsche Reich und die Österreichischen Erblande ..., Bd. 1-5. Schloss Senftenegg 1972.
 Peter Frank zu Döfering, Adelslexikon des Österreichischen Kaisertums 1804-1918. Verzeichnis der Gnadenakte, Standeserhebungen, Adelsanerkennungen und -bestätigungen im Österreichischen Staatsarchiv in Wien, Wien 1989.
 Der Adel von Galizien, Lodomerien und der Bukowina. J. Siebmacher's großes Wappenbuch, Band 32, Nürnberg 1905, s. 67-99.
 Szymon Konarski, Armorial de la noblesse titrèe polonaise, Paris 1958, s. 131-361.
 Tomasz Lenczewski, Genealogie rodów utytułowanych w Polsce, t. I, Warszawa 1997.
 Spiski licam titułowannym rossijskoj imperii, St. Petersburg 1892.
 SZLACHTA POLSKO-INFLANCKA WOBEC PRZEŁOMU. Dybaś Bogusław, Jeziorski Paweł A. SCIENCE IN TORUNIU PUBLISHING.
 Świat polskiej szlachty. Dzieje ludzi i rodzin. Rosołowski Marcin, Bińczyk Arkadiusz. Fundacja im. XBW Ignacego Krasickiego. 2019.

References